Timothy Maurice Paul Tait (born May 29, 1971 in Owen Sound, Canada) is an American/Canadian particle physicist, specializing in theoretical physics, elementary particles and theories of dark matter.  He is responsible for the
proposal that dark matter may be ordinary matter confined to hidden dimensions.
He is currently a professor in the department
of Physics and Astronomy at the University of California, Irvine.

In 2013, he was elected a fellow of the American Physical Society, an honor signifying recognition by one's professional peers.  Tait earned his fellowship for his contributions to the phenomenology of theories of dark matter.

Publications
Professor Tait's publications are available on the INSPIRE-HEP Literature Database.

References

External links
Professor Tait's webpage at UC Irvine
Popular Science Lectures by Tait concerning the Search for the Higgs Boson
Lectures by Tait concerning the Future of Particle Physics after the Higgs Discovery
New Scientist Article "Higgs in space: Orbiting telescope could beat the LHC"

Theoretical physicists
Particle physicists
21st-century American physicists
University of California, Irvine faculty
Fellows of the American Physical Society
Living people
1971 births